James Albert Hard (July 15, 1843 – March 12, 1953) was the last verified living Union combat veteran of the American Civil War and the third-to-last verified veteran overall; only drummer boys Frank H. Mayer and Albert Woolson post-deceased him. Though he claimed to have been born in 1841, research in 2006 found that the 1850 Census indicated a birthdate of 1843.

He died in Rochester, New York, at the claimed age of 111. Census research indicates, however, that he was probably a year or two younger and may have inflated his age in order to enter the military. He is recorded as having joined the Union Army on May 14, 1861, aged 19. The 1850, 1910, and 1920 censuses, however, suggest that he was born in 1843 and 1842 respectively.

Hard served with the 32nd New York Volunteer Infantry as "Albert," participating in the battles of First Bull Run, Antietam,  Fredericksburg, and Chancellorsville. The regiment's term of service expired before the Gettysburg Campaign. He claimed to have met Abraham Lincoln at a White House reception.

See also
 Last surviving United States war veterans

References

External links
 
 Obituary at genealogytrails.com
 32nd NYSV Roster at NY State Military Museum

1841 births
1953 deaths
People of New York (state) in the American Civil War
Burials at Mount Hope Cemetery (Rochester)
American centenarians
Men centenarians
Union Army soldiers